Oscar Paul (8 April 183618 April 1898) was a German musicologist and a music writer, critic, and teacher.

Biography
Oscar Paul was born in Freiwaldau in Silesia (now Gozdnica in the Województwo lubuskie of the Poland).  He studied at Görlitz, and under Louis Plaidy, Ernst Richter and Moritz Hauptmann at the University of Leipzig.  He commenced a career as a pianist, but soon found himself unsuited to it.

After spending time in different German towns, he returned to Leipzig in 1866 to give private lessons in harmony. In 1869 he became a teacher at the Leipzig Conservatory, and in 1872 a professor at the university.  His students included: Felix Weingartner, Leoš Janáček, Fanny Davies, Cornelis Dopper, Alfred Hill, Hans Huber, Ferdinand Pfohl, Anna Diller Starbuck, Theodore Baker, W. Waugh Lauder (the only Canadian student of Franz Liszt),  Rudolf Breithaupt, Johannes Gelbker, Emil Kronke, Heinrich Ordenstein, Albert Ross Parsons, and Otto Schweizer.

He died in 1898 at the age of 62.

Writing
In 1866 Paul published Die absolute Harmonik der Griechen. He edited Hauptmann's Lehre von der Harmonik (1868), and wrote Geschichte des Klaviers (1869) and Handlexikon der Tonkunst (1871–72).
In 1872, he produced his magnum opus, his translation and elucidation of the five-volume work De institutione musica by Boethius. His Lehrbuch der Harmonik came out in 1880.

Paul was a contributor to the Niederrheinische Musik-Zeitung (1853–1867).
He founded and edited the periodical Tonhalle which was merged into Musikalisches Wochenblatt, which he also edited. He was the music critic of the Leipziger Tagblatt for many years.

References

1836 births
1898 deaths
People from Jeseník
German writers about music
German music critics
German music educators
Leipzig University alumni
Academic staff of Leipzig University
Academic staff of the University of Music and Theatre Leipzig
19th-century German journalists
German male journalists
19th-century German male writers
19th-century German musicologists